Martin Lumley may refer to:

Martin Lumley (lord mayor) (died 1634), English merchant who was Lord Mayor of London, 1623
Sir Martin Lumley, 1st Baronet (c. 1596–c. 1651), English politician who sat in the House of Commons from 1641 to 1648
Sir Martin Lumley, 2nd Baronet (c. 1628–1702) of the Lumley baronets
Sir Martin Lumley, 3rd Baronet (1662–1711) of the Lumley baronets